The first season of Drag Race Philippines premiered on August 17, 2022. The cast was announced on July 27, 2022. The winner of the first season of Drag Race Philippines was Precious Paula Nicole, with Marina Summers as runners-up.

Casting occurred in middle 2021 with production starting in early 2022. On July 12, 2022, actor, comedian, and drag queen Paolo Ballesteros was confirmed as the host and main judge. On July 20, 2022, RuPaul's Drag Race season 4 and All Stars season 6 contestant Jiggly Caliente and television personality and impersonator KaladKaren were confirmed as main judges. And lastly, on August 11, 2022, photographer BJ Pascual, fashion designer Rajo Laurel and actor and comedian Jon Santos were announced as the alternating judges for the season.

The season consisted of ten one-hour episodes.

Contestants 

Ages, names, and cities stated are at time of filming.

Notes:

Contestant progress

Lip syncs
Legend:

Judges

Main judges
Paolo Ballesteros, actor, make-up artist, comedian, TV host, model, and impersonator
Jiggly Caliente, actress and drag performer best known for her appearances on RuPaul's Drag Race season 4 and season 6 of RuPaul's Drag Race All Stars and her recurring role on the FX series Pose
KaladKaren, television personality and impersonator

Alternating judges
BJ Pascual, commercial and editorial photographer
Rajo Laurel, fashion designer
Jon Santos, actor, celebrity impersonator, comedian, and writer

Guest judges
Listed in chronological order:
Pops Fernandez, singer, entertainer, entrepreneur, TV host and actress
Pokwang, comedian, actress, television host and singer
Nadine Lustre, actress, singer, and dancer
Regine Velasquez-Alcasid, singer, actress, host, and record producer
Pia Wurtzbach, model, actress and Miss Universe 2015
Patrick Starrr, makeup artist, digital influencer and entrepreneur
Boy Abunda, professor, television host, publicist and talent manager

Special guests
Guests who appeared in episodes, but did not judge on the main stage.

Episode 3: 
 Moophs, musician, producer, songwriter and DJ

Episode 4 and 5:
 Douglas Nierras, artistic director and choreographer

Episode 6:
 Jojie Dingcong, businessman, talent manager and television personality

Episode 10:
 Pia Wurtzbach, model, actress and Miss Universe 2015

Episodes

References

2022 Philippine television seasons
2022 in LGBT history
Drag Race Philippines